Eusphalera is a genus of moths of the family Zygaenidae.

Species
 Eusphalera bicolora Bethune-Baker, 1908
 Eusphalera casta Jordan, 1915
 Eusphalera regina (Rothschild & Jordan, 1903)
 Eusphalera satisbonensis Jordan, 1915
 Eusphalera splendens Bethune-Baker, 1908

References
 Eusphalera at Markku Savela's Lepidoptera and Some Other Life Forms

Chalcosiinae
Zygaenidae genera